Ralf R. Parve (born 6 May 1946 Tallinn) is an Estonian humorist, radio personality and politician. He was a member of VII Riigikogu, representing the Estonian Centre Party.

References

Living people
1946 births
Estonian humorists
Estonian radio personalities 
Estonian Centre Party politicians
Members of the Riigikogu, 1992–1995
Politicians from Tallinn
Burials at Pärnamäe Cemetery